"Note from the Underground" is a story arc that was originally published in Buffy the Vampire Slayer #47–50 by Dark Horse Comics and based on the Buffy television series. It was later reprinted in a trade paperback collected edition.

Story description

Buffy the Vampire Slayer #47
Comic title: Note From The Underground/Hellmouth to Mouth, part 1 

Angel breaks Faith out of jail and the two of them travel to Sunnydale to help control chaos there.

Buffy the Vampire Slayer #48
Comic title: Note From The Underground/Hellmouth to Mouth, part 2 

Angel, Faith, and Pike continue to look for Buffy, whilst the Slayer battles vampires in Hell.

Buffy the Vampire Slayer #49
Comic title: Note From The Underground/Hellmouth to Mouth, part 3 

Buffy must continue her journey through Hell, and meets help (Angel, Faith, and Pike). It is up to them to return Sunnydale to its natural state.

Buffy the Vampire Slayer #50
Comic title: Note From The Underground/Hellmouth to Mouth, part 4 

Buffy rescues Xander and Dawn from The Scourge. Buffy must fight for her friends' and family's lives, and also for the right to live her own life, Faith and Angel help.

Continuity

Supposed to be set in post Buffy season 6. Includes a reformed Faith.
Angel reveals to Buffy that he has a son.

Canonical issues
Buffy comics such as this one are not usually considered by fans as canonical. However, unlike fan fiction, overviews summarizing their story, written early in the writing process, were approved by both Fox and Joss Whedon (or his office), and the books were therefore later published as officially Buffy merchandise.